Matthew Joseph Butler, CMG (November 1856 – 22 June 1933) was a Canadian civil engineer, businessman, civil servant, and author.

Life 
Butler was born in Mill Point, Upper Canada in November 1856. He studied at  University of Toronto. He worked for John Dunlop Evans and Thomas Oliver Bolger. He was Deputy Minister and Chief Engineer of the Department of Railways and Canals from 1905 to 1910.

He died in Sydney, Nova Scotia, on 22 June 1933.

References 

1856 births
1933 deaths
Canadian Companions of the Order of St Michael and St George
Canadian civil engineers
Canadian businesspeople
Canadian civil servants